Tes or TES may refer to:

Places
 Tés, a village in Hungary
 Tes River, a river in Mongolia
 Tes, Uvs, a district in Mongolia's Uvs Province
 Tes, Zavkhan, a district in Mongolia's Zavkhan Province
 Teş, a village in Brestovăț Commune, Timiș County, Romania

Arts and entertainment
 Teatrul Evreiesc de Stat, the State Jewish Theater in Romania
 The Early Show, a morning television program on CBS in the United States
 The Elder Scrolls, a video game series by Bethesda Softworks
 The Eminem Show, a 2002 album by hip-hop artist Eminem
 Tes (rapper), American rapper from Brooklyn, New York, US

Science and technology
 Thermal energy storage, a group of technologies which are used to store and release thermal energy
 Transition edge sensor, a type of superconducting detector used in physics and astronomy
 Bellanca TES, an experimental aircraft constructed by Giuseppe Mario Bellanca in 1929

Biology and chemistry
 TES (buffer), a common buffer solution in biology
 TES (protein), or "testin", the protein product of the TESS gene in Homo sapiens
 Triethylsilane, a trialkylsilicon hydride compound 
 Twin embolisation syndrome, in which a fetus dies in utero and is reabsorbed by its twin

Spaceflight
 Technology Experiment Satellite, a satellite launched in 2001 by the Indian Space Research Organization
 Thermal Emission Spectrometer, a scientific instrument aboard Mars Global Surveyor
 Tropospheric Emission Spectrometer, a satellite instrument designed by the NASA Jet Propulsion Laboratory

Military
 Tactical engagement simulation, a training system of the U.S. Army
 Theater Event System, a United States missile defense program

Publications
 TES (magazine), formerly the Times Educational Supplement
 Tatar Encyclopaedia, a 2002 Tatar-language book on the history of the Tatar people
 Talmud Eser Sefirot, a Kabbalistic book written by Rabbi Yehuda Ashlag

Schools
 Taipei European School, an international school in Taipei, Taiwan
 The English School (Colegio de Inglaterra), an international school in Bogotá, Colombia

Other uses
 The Eulenspiegel Society, a U.S. non-profit BDSM organization
 Technical Element Score, a part of the ISU Judging System for scoring figure skating competition
 Transcranial electrical stimulation (tES), a group of brain stimulation techniques including transcranial random noise stimulation

See also
 Te (disambiguation)
 Tess (disambiguation)
 Test (disambiguation)